Carrigkerry is a village and townland in County Limerick, Ireland. The village is located in the civil parish of Ardagh, on the R523 regional road. Carrigkerry is a census town, and had a population of 184 as of the 2016 census. 

Carrigkerry is in the Roman Catholic Diocese of Limerick in the parish of Ardagh & Carrigkerry  The local church is dedicated to Saint Mary and was built in 1878. The local national (primary) school, Carrigkerry National School, had an enrollment of 52 pupils as of 2017.

References

Towns and villages in County Limerick